IAM–Excelsior is a professional road bicycle racing team which participates in elite races. The team registered with the UCI for the 2019 season.

Team roster

Major results
2019
Stage 1 Tour du Loir et Cher E Provost, Simon Pellaud
Stage 2 Tour du Loir et Cher E Provost, Fabian Lienhard
Flèche Ardennaise, Simon Pellaud
Overall Tour de la Mirabelle, Simon Pellaud

References

Cycling teams established in 2019
UCI Continental Teams (Europe)
Cycling teams based in Switzerland